Soap Creek is a stream in Monroe, Appanoose, Davis and Wapello counties of Iowa. It is a tributary of the Des Moines River.

The stream headwaters arise in Monroe County at  adjacent to the west side of Iowa  Highway 5 approximately six miles south-southwest of Albia.
Th stream flows east and then southeast to pass through the northeast corner of Appanoose County and into Davis County. It flows southeast through a section of the Soap Creek Water Management Area to turn to the east just north of the community of Blackhawk. The stream continues east through northeastern Davis County passing under US Route 63 and north of the community of Floris.

References

Rivers of Iowa
Rivers of Appanoose County, Iowa
Rivers of Davis County, Iowa
Rivers of Monroe County, Iowa
Rivers of Wapello County, Iowa